André François (born 1 July 1964) is a Vincentian sprinter. He competed in the men's 200 metres at the 1988 Summer Olympics.

Career
François was part of the first Saint Vincent and the Grenadines team to compete at the Summer Olympics in 1988.  He competed in the Men's 200 Metres.  He ran his heat in 21.88 seconds and finished seventh out of eight runners.  This was not quick enough for him to advance to the next round.

References

1964 births
Living people
Saint Vincent and the Grenadines male sprinters
Olympic athletes of Saint Vincent and the Grenadines
Athletes (track and field) at the 1988 Summer Olympics
Place of birth missing (living people)